Jang Eun-kyu (born 15 August 1992) is a South Korean footballer who plays as midfielder for Daejeon Korail FC.

Career
He joined Jeju United before 2014 season starts.

References

External links 

1992 births
Living people
Association football midfielders
South Korean footballers
Jeju United FC players
Gyeongnam FC players
Seongnam FC players
FC Anyang players
Gimcheon Sangmu FC players
K League 1 players
K League 2 players
Konkuk University alumni